The 39th Australian Film Institute Awards (generally known as the AFI Awards) were held in 1997.  Presented by the Australian Film Institute (AFI), the awards celebrated the best in Australian feature film, documentary, short film and television productions of 1997.
Bill Bennett's Kiss Or Kill won five awards for feature films, with Doing Time for Patsy Cline winning four.  Producer Jan Chapman received the Raymond Longford Award for lifetime achievement.

Winners and nominees
Winners are listed first and highlighted in boldface.

Feature film

Non-feature film

Additional awards

Television

References

External links
 The Australian Film Institute | Australian Academy of Cinema and Television Arts official website

AACTA Awards ceremonies
AACTA Awards
AACTA Awards
AACTA Awards
AACTA Awards